The 1916 Connecticut gubernatorial election was held on November 7, 1916. Incumbent Republican Marcus H. Holcomb defeated Democratic nominee Morris Beardsley with 51.12% of the vote.

General election

Candidates
Major party candidates
Marcus H. Holcomb, Republican
Morris Beardsley, Democratic

Other candidates
Herbert Beebe, Socialist
G. Whitfield Simonson, Prohibition
Charles B. Wells, Socialist Labor

Results

References

1916
Connecticut
Gubernatorial